Johanne Trudel (born November 4, 1953) is a judge currently serving on the Canadian Federal Court of Appeal.

Notes

1953 births
Living people
Judges of the Federal Court of Appeal (Canada)
Canadian women judges